Mahathir Cabinet is the name of either of seven cabinets of Malaysia:
Mahathir Cabinet I (1981–1982)
Mahathir Cabinet II (1982–1986)
Mahathir Cabinet III (1986–1990)
Mahathir Cabinet IV (1990–1995)
Mahathir Cabinet V (1995–1999)
Mahathir Cabinet VI (1999–2003)
Mahathir Cabinet VII (2018–2020)